Church of the Nativity or Nativity Church or variations on these are names shared by several churches around the world:

 Church of the Nativity, Opočno, Czech Republic
 Nativity Church, Căuşeni, Moldova
 Church of the Nativity, in Bethlehem, built over the place considered to be the birthplace of Jesus Christ

Russia
 Church of the Nativity (Magadan), a Roman Catholic church serving victims of Stalin's forced labor camps
 Church of the Nativity (Nizhnekundryuchenskaya)
 Church of the Nativity in Krokhino, a former church that is submerged underwater

United States
 Episcopal Church of the Nativity (Huntsville, Alabama), listed on the NRHP in Alabama
 Church of the Nativity (Menlo Park, California), listed on the NRHP in California
 Episcopal Church of the Nativity (Rosedale, Louisiana), listed on the NRHP in Louisiana
 Church of the Nativity (Manhattan), a Roman Catholic parish located on 2nd Avenue in New York City
 Episcopal Church of the Nativity (Union, South Carolina), listed on the NRHP in South Carolina

See also
Cathedral of the Nativity (disambiguation)
Church of the Nativity of Mary (disambiguation)